Cudniki  is a village in the administrative district of Gmina Krośniewice, within Kutno County, Łódź Voivodeship, in central Poland.

The village has a population of 40.

References

Cudniki